The Mayor of the City of Bishkek is head of the executive branch of the political system of the Government of Bishkek, the capital of Kyrgyzstan. The mayor's office administers all city services, public property, police and fire protection, most public agencies, and enforces all city and state laws within Bishkek.

Purpose 
The mayor defines the main directions of social and economic development of the city of Bishkek, financial and economic and industrial policy, the development and implementation of citywide and targeted programs, the activities of the city halls of Bishkek. He also provides for the implementation of administrative reform, measures to develop the system of local self-government, to increase the efficiency of the work of city government bodies by improving and optimizing their structure and functions.

Mayor's Office 
The mayor's office includes the following staff:

 First Vice Mayor
 Vice Mayor
 Vice Mayor
 Vice Mayor
 Vice Mayor
 Head of Office, Mayor's Office of Bishkek

List of mayors of the City of Bishkek

Previous leaders of Bishkek

Chairpersons of the Executive Committee (1917–1991) 

 Bayan Alamanov
 Absamat Masaliyev (1972-1974)
 October Mederov (1974-1980)
 Amangeldy Mursadykovich Muraliev (1988-1991)

First Secretary of the Frunze City Committee 
The First Secretary of the Frunze City Committee of the Communist Party of Kirghizia was the paramount leader of the city.

 Ivan Ivanov (1950-1958)
 Turdakun Usubaliev (1958-1961)
 Andrey Buss (1961-1970)
 Kenesh Kulmatov (1970-1973)
 Karybek Moldobaev (1973 1985)
 Ulukbek Chinaliev (1985-1990)

See also
 Timeline of Bishkek

References 

 
Bishkek
Mayors